José Iván Moreno Dellano (born 26 January 1981 in Plasencia, Extremadura) is a Spanish former professional footballer who played as a right winger.

He appeared in 130 Segunda División matches over four seasons, scoring a total of 12 goals for CD Guadalajara, SD Ponferradina, Real Murcia and Racing de Santander.

External links

1981 births
Living people
People from Plasencia
Sportspeople from the Province of Cáceres
Spanish footballers
Footballers from Extremadura
Association football wingers
Segunda División players
Segunda División B players
Tercera División players
Benidorm CF footballers
CD Don Benito players
CD Guadalajara (Spain) footballers
SD Ponferradina players
Real Murcia players
Racing de Santander players
La Roda CF players